Tang-e Cheh Zarreh is a village in Mohr Rural District, in the Central District of Mohr County, Fars Province, Iran. At the 2006 census, its population was 19, in 4 families.

References 

Populated places in Mohr County